Winners of the Locus Award for Best Novel, awarded by Locus magazine.  Awards presented in a given year are for works published in the previous calendar year.

The award for Best Novel was presented from 1971 (when the awards began) to 1979.  Since 1980, awards have been presented for Best SF Novel and Best Fantasy Novel.

Winners

See also
Locus Award for Best Science Fiction Novel
Locus Award for Best Fantasy Novel
Locus Award for Best Horror Novel
Locus Award for Best First Novel

External links
 Locus

American literary awards
Novel